The Williams Fork Formation is a Campanian (Edmontonian) geologic formation of the Mesaverde Group in Colorado. Dinosaur remains are among the fossils that have been recovered from the formation, most notably Pentaceratops sternbergii,. Other fossils found in the formation are the ammonite Lewyites, neosuchian crocodylomorphs, and the mammals Glasbius and Meniscoessus collomensis.

See also 
 List of dinosaur-bearing rock formations
 List of stratigraphic units with indeterminate dinosaur fossils

References

Bibliography

Further reading 
 J. R. Foster and R. K. Hunt-Foster. 2015. First report of a giant neosuchian (Crocodyliformes) in the Williams Fork Formation (Upper Cretaceous: Campanian) of Colorado. Cretaceous Research 55:66-73
 W. J. Kennedy, W. A. Cobban, and G. R. Scott. 2000. Heteromorph ammonites from the Upper Campanian (Upper Cretaceous) Baculites cuneatus and Baculites reesidei zones of the Pierre Shale in Colorado, USA. Acta Geologica Polonica 50:1-20
 J. A. Lillegraven. 1987. Stratigraphic and evolutionary implications of a new species of Meniscoessus (Multituberculata, Mammalia) from the Upper Cretaceous Williams Fork Formation, Moffat County, Colorado. Dakoterra 3:46-56
 Sullivan, R.M., and Lucas, S.G. 2006. "The Kirtlandian land-vertebrate "age" – faunal composition, temporal position and biostratigraphic correlation in the nonmarine Upper Cretaceous of western North America." New Mexico Museum of Natural History and Science, Bulletin 35:7-29.

Geologic formations of Colorado
Cretaceous Colorado
Campanian Stage
Mudstone formations
Sandstone formations of the United States
Fluvial deposits
Shallow marine deposits